Yakuhananomia is a genus of beetles in the family Mordellidae, containing the following species:

 Yakuhananomia bidentata (Say, 1824)
 Yakuhananomia ermischi Franciscolo, 1952
 Yakuhananomia fulviceps (Champion, 1891)
 Yakuhananomia polyspila (Fairmaire, 1897)
 Yakuhananomia tsuyukii Takakuwa, 1978
 Yakuhananomia tui (Horák, 1996)
 Yakuhananomia uenoi Takakuwa, 1995
 Yakuhananomia yakui (Kônô, 1930)

References

Mordellidae